James "Seaweed" Pettie (October 24, 1953 – August 31, 2019) was a Canadian professional ice hockey goaltender who played 21 games in the National Hockey League (NHL) with the Boston Bruins between 1976 and 1979.

Pettie was born in Toronto, Ontario. 

As a youth, he played in the 1965 and 1966 Quebec International Pee-Wee Hockey Tournaments with a minor ice hockey team from Toronto. 

Pettie died in Rochester, New York, on August 31, 2019 at the age of 65, due to cancer.

Career statistics

Regular season and playoffs

References

External links
 

1953 births
2019 deaths
Canadian ice hockey goaltenders
Birmingham Bulls (CHL) players
Boston Bruins draft picks
Boston Bruins players
Broome Dusters players
Dayton Gems players
New Haven Nighthawks players
Richmond Rifles players
Rochester Americans players
St. Catharines Black Hawks players
Ice hockey people from Toronto